The Adamas Institute of Technology or AIT is an engineering college in West Bengal, India.It was established in 2008 by RICE Education Group. The college is affiliated with Maulana Abul Kalam Azad University of Technology and all the programmes are approved by the All India Council for Technical Education.

The campus is located along Barasat - Barrackpore Road, Barbaria, North 24 Parganas.

See also

References

External links
Official Adamas Institute of Technology
University Grants Commission
National Assessment and Accreditation Council

Engineering colleges in West Bengal
Universities and colleges in North 24 Parganas district
Colleges affiliated to West Bengal University of Technology
Barasat
Educational institutions established in 2008
2008 establishments in West Bengal